USS Winslow (Destroyer No. 53/DD-53) was an  built for the United States Navy prior to the American entry into World War I. The ship was the second US Navy vessel named in honor of John Ancrum Winslow, a US Navy officer notable for sinking the Confederate commerce raider  during the American Civil War.

Winslow was laid down by William Cramp & Sons of Philadelphia in October 1913 and launched in February 1915. She was armed with four  guns and had eight 21 inch (533 mm) torpedo tubes.
			
After her August 1915 commissioning, Winslow sailed off the east coast and in the Caribbean. After the United States entered World War I in April 1917, Winslow was sent overseas to patrol the Irish Sea out of Queenstown, Ireland. Winslow made several unsuccessful attacks on U-boats, and rescued survivors of several ships sunk by the German craft.

Upon returning to the United States after the war, Winslow was placed in reduced commission in December 1919. She was decommissioned at Philadelphia in June 1922. In November she dropped her name to free it for a new destroyer of the same name, becoming known only as DD-53. She was struck from the Naval Vessel Register in January 1936 and sold for scrapping in June.

Design and construction
Construction of the vessel was awarded to William Cramp & Sons of Philadelphia which laid down her keel on 1 October 1913. On 11 February 1915, Winslow was launched by sponsor Miss Natalie E. Winslow, grandniece of the ship's namesake, John Ancrum Winslow. The ship was the second ship named for Winslow, a US Navy officer notable for sinking the Confederate commerce raider  during the American Civil War.

Winslow had two Zoelly steam turbines that drove her two screw propellers, and an additional pair triple-expansion steam engines, each connected to one of the propeller shafts, for cruising purposes.

Winslow was also equipped with eight  torpedo tubes. The General Board of the United States Navy had called for two anti-aircraft guns for the O'Brien-class ships, as well as provisions for laying up to 36 floating mines. From sources, it is unclear if these recommendations were followed for Winslow or any of the other ships of the class.

Pre-World War I
Winslow was commissioned into the United States Navy on 7 August 1915 under the command of Lieutenant Commander Neil E. Nichols. After trials off the upper east coast, Winslow joined the 6th Division, Atlantic Fleet Torpedo Flotilla. The destroyer participated in maneuvers in Cuban waters during the winter of 1915 and 1916 and, in the spring, began operations along the eastern seaboard. By October 1916, she was serving in coastal waters near Newport, Rhode Island.

At 0530 on 8 October 1916, wireless reports came in of a German submarine stopping ships near the Lightship Nantucket, off the eastern end of Long Island. After an SOS from the British steamer  was received at about 1230, Rear Admiral Albert Gleaves ordered Winslow and other destroyers at Newport to attend to survivors. The American destroyers arrived on the scene about 1700 when the U-boat,  under the command of Kapitänleutnant Hans Rose, was in the process of stopping the Holland-America Line cargo ship . Shortly after, U-53 stopped the British passenger ship . As Rose had done with three other ships U-53 had sunk earlier in the day, he gave passengers and crew aboard Blommersdijk and Stephano adequate time to abandon the ships before sinking the pair. In total, 226 survivors from U-53s five victims were rescued by the destroyer flotilla.

At the end of October, the warship went into the New York Navy Yard and remained there through the end of the year. In January 1917, she steamed south to Cuba, where she joined the rest of the Fleet to participate in annual winter maneuvers. Following the Fleet exercise, Winslow returned north to the Chesapeake.

World War I
When the United States declared war on Germany on 6 April 1917 entering World War I, the destroyer was anchored in the York River near Yorktown, Virginia. She had been there guarding the river mouth since February when American relations with Germany began to deteriorate as a result of the latter country's return to unrestricted submarine warfare. Soon after US Congress declared war, Winslow moved north to the New York Navy Yard to prepare for duty overseas. After a 10-day passage, Winslow reported for duty at Queenstown, Ireland, on the 17th. On the 21st, she began patrolling the approaches to the British Isles.

Winslow operated out of Queenstown for almost a year escorting convoys into and out of Queenstown and going to the assistance of ships attacked by U-boats. Just after midnight on 11 June, she spied her first submarine and rushed to the attack. Her target submerged, and the destroyer dropped a series of depth charges. She failed, however, to find any evidence supporting the success of her attack and resumed her patrol.

She sighted another U-boat off Queenstown on 16 August, but heavy weather covered the submarine's tracks when it submerged and Winslow made no attack.

When the destroyer reached the  sailing vessel, she was in flames, and the U-boat had just submerged. Winslow dropped a depth charge barrage on what appeared to be the submarine's moving wake, but broke off the attack to assist the schooner's crew; all were saved, but Henry Lippitt was sunk.

During the remainder of her assignment at Queenstown, Winslow attacked two more submarines, the first on 11 October and the second on 3 January 1918. In both cases, she depth-charged oil slicks which appeared to originate from damaged, submerged U-boats. In neither case did she receive visible confirmation of a sinking; however, during the 3 January attack, one of her depth charges threw a large mass of dark liquid high in the air. From this description, it appears that her depth charge brought up fuel oil from what was believed to be . Unfortunately for Winslow, lack of definite proof kept her from being credited with a sinking.

At the beginning of April 1918, the destroyer was reassigned to the United States Naval Forces in France. Operating from Brest, she spent the remainder of the war escorting American troop transports into French ports. Although she engaged German submarines on at least seven different occasions, she did not score any confirmed successes.

On 5 September, she attacked the German submarine , which had just torpedoed U.S. Navy transport . Depth charges dropped by Winslow, and  failed to sink the U-boat, but, combined with defensive efforts from Mount Vernon herself, helped prevent the submarine from launching a coup de grâce against the former German liner. Mount Vernon safely made it back to Brest with the loss of 37 crewmen out of the 1,450 persons on board.

Winslow continued her patrols out of Brest through the end of hostilities on 11 November.

Inter-war period

Following the signing of the Armistice on 11 November, which ended all fighting, Winslow remained in French waters.

After her return to the United States, Winslow resumed peacetime duty with the Atlantic Fleet. During May, she served as one of the rescue pickets stationed along the route across the Atlantic flown by three Navy NC-type seaplanes in the first aerial crossing of the Atlantic. After that, the destroyer returned to normal operations along the east coast and annual winter maneuvers in Cuban waters until placed in reduced commission at Philadelphia on 10 December 1919.

In July 1920, she was assigned the hull code of DD-53 under the US Navy's alphanumeric classification system. Winslow was decommissioned at Philadelphia on 5 June 1922. On 1 July 1933, she dropped the name Winslow to free it for a new destroyer of the same name, becoming known only as DD-53. The ship was struck from the Naval Vessel Register on 7 January 1936, and, on 30 June, was sold for scrapping.

References

Notes

Bibliography

External links

O'Brien-class destroyers
Ships built by William Cramp & Sons
1915 ships
World War I destroyers of the United States